Everett is a borough in Bedford County, Pennsylvania, United States. The population was 1,775 at the 2020 census.

Everett's original name was Bloody Run, after a creek that was the site of a battle between settlers and Native Americans. The town was renamed in honor of Massachusetts politician and orator Edward Everett.

Bestselling American novelist Dean Koontz was born in Everett.

History
In 1787, Michael Barndollar purchased the land in this area, and laid out a town which was originally called Waynesburg.

This name was never widely used and this small village was incorporated as a borough in November 1860, to be known as Bloody Run. While this name carries with it many interesting stories and much history, the name was changed in February 1873 to Everett.

The Everett Historic District was added to the National Register of Historic Places in 2003.

Geography
Everett is located in eastern Bedford County at  (40.014049, -78.373202). It is bordered on the south by the unincorporated community of Earlston.

Located in a valley of the Allegheny Mountains, Everett sits within a natural transportation corridor where the Raystown Branch of the Juniata River has carved a water gap, called The Narrows, through Tussey Mountain. The Alleghenies are a sub-region of the much larger Appalachian Mountains, and cover an area of central Pennsylvania, western Maryland and northern West Virginia. The countryside surrounding Everett is composed mainly of large forested areas, extensive agricultural fields, pasture, small villages, and woodlots.

U.S. Route 30 bypasses the borough along its northern edge. The highway's former route, the Lincoln Highway (now US-30 Business), passes through the center of town as Main Street. Interstate 76, the Pennsylvania Turnpike, passes just south of the borough but does not provide access, with the nearest exits being Bedford  to the west and Breezewood  to the east.

Pennsylvania's longest hiking trail, the Mid State Trail, passes directly through the center of town, before continuing on towards nearby Rainsburg.

Climate

Demographics

As of the census of 2000, there were 1,905 people, 876 households, and 515 families residing in the borough. The population density was 1,773.4 people per square mile (687.4/km²). There were 967 housing units at an average density of 900.2 per square mile (348.9/km²). The racial makeup of the borough was 98.43% White, 0.52% African American, 0.26% Asian, 0.26% from other races, and 0.52% from two or more races. Hispanic or Latino of any race were 0.52% of the population.

There were 876 households, out of which 27.6% had children under the age of 18 living with them, 43.5% were married couples living together, 12.0% had a female householder with no husband present, and 41.1% were non-families. Of all households 38.5% were made up of individuals, and 18.3% had someone living alone who was 65 years of age or older. The average household size was 2.15 and the average family size was 2.79.

In the borough the population was spread out, with 22.9% under the age of 18, 8.6% from 18 to 24, 26.3% from 25 to 44, 21.6% from 45 to 64, and 20.6% who were 65 years of age or older. The median age was 39 years. For every 100 females there were 83.2 males. For every 100 females age 18 and over, there were 76.9 males.

The median income for a household in the borough was $23,919, and the median income for a family was $33,819. Males had a median income of $26,953 versus $16,196 for females. The per capita income for the borough was $15,841. About 13.3% of families and 19.2% of the population were below the poverty line, including 22.7% of those under age 18 and 18.7% of those age 65 or over.

Notable people
 Dean Koontz, author
 William Piper (1774-1852) - U.S. Representative from Pennsylvania
 Bud Shuster, Republican congressman

See also
 Bloody Run Canoe Classic
 Everett Area School District
 Tenley Park
 WSKE
 WZSK

References

External links

Everett Area Better Business Association - visitor information

1860 establishments in Pennsylvania
Boroughs in Bedford County, Pennsylvania
Populated places established in 1795